Cleaner production is a preventive, company-specific environmental protection initiative.  It is intended to minimize waste and emissions and maximize product output.  By analysing the flow of materials and energy in a company, one tries to identify options to minimize waste and emissions out of industrial processes through source reduction strategies.  Improvements of organisation and technology help to reduce or suggest better choices in use of materials and energy,  and to avoid waste, waste water generation, and gaseous emissions, and also waste heat and noise.

Overview
The concept was developed during the preparation of the Rio Summit as a programme of UNEP (United Nations Environmental Programme) and UNIDO (United Nations Industrial Development Organization) under the leadership of Jacqueline Aloisi de Larderel, the former Assistant Executive Director of UNEP. The programme was meant to reduce the environmental impact of industry. It built on ideas used by 3M in its 3P programme (pollution prevention pays). It has found more international support than all other comparable programmes. The programme idea was described "...to assist developing nations in leapfrogging from pollution to less pollution, using available technologies". Starting from the simple idea to produce with less waste Cleaner Production was developed into a concept to increase the resource efficiency of production in general. UNIDO has been operating National Cleaner Production Centers and Programmes (NCPCs/NCPPs) with centres in Latin America, Africa, Asia and Europe.

In the US, the term pollution prevention is more commonly used for cleaner production.

Options
Examples for cleaner production options are: 

Documentation of consumption (as a basic analysis of material and energy flows, e. g. with a Sankey diagram) 
Use of indicators and controlling (to identify losses from poor planning, poor education and training, mistakes)
Substitution of raw materials and auxiliary materials (especially renewable materials and energy) 
Increase of useful life of auxiliary materials and process liquids (by avoiding drag in, drag out, contamination) 
Improved control and automatisation 
Reuse of waste (internal or external) 
New, low waste processes and technologies

Initiatives
One of the first European initiatives in cleaner production was started in Austria in 1992 by the BMVIT (Bundesministerium für Verkehr, Innovation und Technologie). This resulted in two initiatives: "Prepare" and EcoProfit.

The "PIUS" initiative was founded in Germany in 1999. Since 1994, the United Nations Industrial Development Organization operates the National Cleaner Production Centre Programme with centres in Central America, South America, Africa, Asia, and Europe.

See also

 Cradle-to-cradle design
 Energy conservation
 Environmental management
 Environmental Quality Management
 Green design
 Industrial ecology
 ISO 9001
 ISO 14001
 Source reduction)
 Sustainability
 Total quality management
 Waste minimisation
 Clean Production Agreement

References

Bibliography
 Fresner, J., Bürki, T., Sittig, H., Ressourceneffizienz in der Produktion -Kosten senken durch Cleaner Production, Symposion Publishing, 2009
 Organisation For Economic Co-Operation And Development(OECD)(Hrsg.): Technologies For Cleaner Production And Products- Towards Technological Transformation For Sustainable Development. Paris: OECD, 1995 Google Books
 Pauli, G., From Deep Ecology to The Blue Economy, 2011,  ZERI
 Schaltegger,S. ; Bennett, M.; Burritt, R. & Jasch, C.: Environmental Management Accounting as a Support for Cleaner Production, in: Schaltegger,S.; Bennett, M.; Burritt, R. & Jasch, C. (Eds): Environmental Management Accounting for Cleaner Production. Dordrecht: Springer, 2008, 3-26

External links
Cleaner Production by sectors
Clean Production Council Chile Official site of the National Service that promotes Cleaner Production in that country. 
Journal of Cleaner Production 
National Pollution Prevention Roundtable Finds P2 Programs Effective (article)
Pollution prevention in China
Pollution prevention directory: TURI - Toxics Use Reduction Institute
United States National Pollution Prevention Information Center
United States  Pollution Prevention Regional Information Center

Waste minimisation
Environmental engineering
Industrial ecology
Waste management concepts